Khaja is an Indian deep-fried pastry, commonly filled with fruit or soaked with sugar syrup.

History 

Khaja, plain or sweet mentioned in Silao, was a wheat flour preparation fried in ghee. Khaja is believed to have originated from the eastern parts of the former state of Magadh and the former United Provinces and Magadh. Silao , Nalanda districts of Bihar. and is also native to state of Magadh as well as regions like Kutch and Andhra Pradesh.  Refined wheat flour with sugar is made into layered dough, with or without dry fruit or other stuffing, and lightly fried in oil to make khaja. It is one of the famous sweets of Silao and is related to emotions of all Magadh people. It is also offered as an offering  Magadh. International sweets of Magadh.

Khajas from Silao and Rajgir in Bihar are almost entirely similar to baklava, whereas the ones from Odisha and Andhra Pradesh are made with thicker pastry sheets, and are generally hard. The batter is prepared from wheat flour, mawa and oil. It is then deep fried until crisp, before being soaked in  a sugar syrup known as Paga, the pastry absorbing the syrup. Khaja served in of Kakinada, a coastal town of Andhra Pradesh, are served dry on the outside and soaked with sugar syrup on the inside.

Khaja sweet is popular in Magahia and Bihari in Magadha. This sweet is a part of Chhath Puja, given as a gift at the daughter's wedding in Magadh Bihar.

See also
Kakinada khaja
Indian sweets

References

Bihari cuisine
Odia cuisine
Kutchi cuisine
Indian pastries